Your Soft Eyes is an album by American jazz pianist Kenny Drew recorded in 1981 and released on the Soul Note label.

Reception
The Allmusic review awarded the album 4 stars stating "it is well worth tracking down".

Track listing
All compositions by Kenny Drew except as indicated
 "Forgotten But Not Gone" - 3:52   
 "Alone Together" (Howard Dietz, Arthur Schwartz) - 9:50   
 "Your Soft Eyes" - 5:06   
 "Evening in the Park" - 5:18   
 "How Are Things in Glocca Morra?" (E. Y. Harburg, Burton Lane) - 7:36   
 "Mads' Blues" - 8:23

Personnel
Kenny Drew - piano
Mads Vinding - bass
Ed Thigpen - drums

References

Kenny Drew albums
1982 albums
Black Saint/Soul Note albums